Solow is a surname. Notable people with the surname include:

 Alan Solow, an American lawyer and Jewish leader
 Herbert Solow (journalist) (1903–1964), an American journalist
 Herbert Franklin Solow (1931–2020), an American producer, director, studio executive, talent agent, and writer
 Jeffrey Solow (born 1949), an American cello virtuoso
 Jennifer Solow, an American novelist
 Robert Solow (born 1924), an American economist, winner of the Nobel Prize in Economics
 Sheldon Solow, an American real estate mogul and billionaire

See also
 Solow (horse), a Thoroughbred racehorse
 The Solow Building, a Manhattan skyscraper

Slavic-language surnames
Jewish surnames